Nie Jingjing (born 1 March 1988) is a female racewalker from China. She came in fourth place in the Women's 20 kilometres walk event at the 2014 Asian Games in Incheon, South Korea and also competed in the Women's 20 kilometres walk event at the 2015 World Championships in Athletics in Beijing, China.

See also
 China at the 2015 World Championships in Athletics

References

Chinese female racewalkers
Living people
Place of birth missing (living people)
1988 births
World Athletics Championships athletes for China
Athletes (track and field) at the 2014 Asian Games
Asian Games competitors for China